Louis Budts (7 September 1890 – 29 December 1977) was a Belgian racing cyclist. He rode in the 1921 Tour de France.

References

1890 births
1977 deaths
Belgian male cyclists
Place of birth missing